Plazy is a municipality and village in Mladá Boleslav District in the Central Bohemian Region of the Czech Republic. It has about 500 inhabitants.

Administrative parts
The village of Valy is an administrative part of Plazy.

Geography
It lies in a flat agricultural landscape in the Jičín Uplands.

History
The first written mention of Plazy is from 1322.

Economy
In the eastern part of the municipal territory there is an extensive industrial zone, which partially extends into the territory of neighbouring Mladá Boleslav. The largest company based here is the automotive parts manufacturer Faurecia Interior Systems Bohemia.

Sights
The main landmark of Plazy is the Church of Saints Simon and Jude. It is a Baroque church built in 1739. It replaced an old church, first mentioned in 1394, which was destroyed by the fall of the newly added tower in 1731.

References

External links

Villages in Mladá Boleslav District